The 1949 Duquesne Dukes football team was an American football team that represented Duquesne University as an independent during the 1949 college football season. In its first and only season under head coach Phil Ahwesh, Duquesne compiled a 3–6 record and was outscored by a total of 210 to 140.

Schedule

References

Duquesne
Duquesne Dukes football seasons
Duquesne Dukes football